Armin Baumgarten (born 25 September 1967 in Wolfsburg) is a German painter and sculptor.

Life 
Armin Baumgarten spent his childhood in Lower Saxony and dealt early with drawing and painting, supported by his art teacher Wilfried Wöhler also with etching. After graduating from Humboldt Gymnasium in Gifhorn and alternative civilian service in Brunswick, he started there in 1989 at the Braunschweig University of Art the study of Painting. His teachers were Hinnerk Schrader, Karl Moller, D. Arwed Gorella and Hermann Albert, his master pupil in 1996 he had been. In 1995 he was a founding member of the group of painters named "convention". In 1996 he married the painter Birte Kulms. In 1997 he received a scholarship to live and work of the association Künstlerhaus Meinersen in Meinersen. In 1998 he moved to Düsseldorf. There he created next new topics in painting. From 2003 he developed also first sculptures (bronze casting). In 2007 he created a cross picture for Tersteegenkirche in Düsseldorf.

Work 
The works of Armin Baumgarten arise beyond the antagonism between the figurative and the abstract, i.e. this picture is not borrowed from the optical reality, but establishes itself within a picturesque charging process on the scene as a separate image reality. From the painting originally thin liquid Armin Baumgarten came to a very tactile, impasto ductus gain by the motifs a physical presence. This development process resulted since 2003 in the study of sculpture that is created first in a lengthy process of work up and ablation of gypsum and is then implemented as a bronze casting. The paintings and sculptures revolve archaic basic, essential topics such as the head, figure and figure group, countryside and mountain or tree. This image is compressed in the work process in a reduced to the essential iconic shape that is possible directly sensual and physically not only visible to the viewer, but also experienced.

Selected exhibitions 
 1989 Kreismuseum Hornburg, together with Peter Lindenberg, Hornburg, Germany
 1993 drawings, White Hall of the City Museum, Braunschweig, Germany
 1996 Convention Kunsthalle Braunschweig, Braunschweig, Germany
 1998 master class 96, Kunsthalle Braunschweig, Braunschweig, Germany
 1996 Convention, the MMI Academy, Riddagshausen, Germany
 1997 photos and drawings, Künstlerhaus Meinersen, Meinersen, Germany
 1997 5 Exhibition to promote young artists from the Federal Republic of Germany, Gästehaus Petersberg, Königswinter, Germany
 1997 Convention 1997, Städtische Galerie house "Eichenmüller", Lemgo, Germany
 1998 Due Dimensioni, Giovane Arte in Italia e Germania, Accademia di Belle Arti di Venezia, Venice, Italy
 1998 body and mind, Sport University Cologne, Germany
 1998 Martin Leyer-Pritzkow exhibitions, Düsseldorf, Germany
 1999 Gallery DE, Düsseldorf, Germany
 1999 Forum for Young Art, Burscheid, Germany
 1999 Art Multiple, Düsseldorf, Germany
 2000 People pictures with works by Adolf Bierbrauer, Fabrizio Gazzarri, Martin Leyer – Pritzkow exhibitions, Düsseldorf, Germany
 2000 Due Dimensioni, Giovane Arte in Italia e Germania, Il pescheria di Nuova, Rovigo, Italy
 2000 Salon des Arts Modern, Sélection Internationale, Eupen, Belgium
 2001 Young Figuratives, inter alia with Hans-Jörg Holubitschka, Peter Lindenberg, Oliver Lochau, Bernard Lokai, Stefan Müller (alias Stefan Schwarzmüller), Katrin Roeber, Ketterer Kunst in Carolinen Palais, Munich, Germany
 2001 New Works, Martin Leyer-Pritzkow exhibitions, Düsseldorf, Germany
 2001 Open Art Line, Open Art Gallery, Borken, Germany
 2001 2ième Salon des Arts Modern, Selection International, Eupen, Belgium
 2002 Armin Baumgarten + Stephen O'Driscoll, Winter Gallery, Wiesbaden, Germany
 2002 head and mask Gallery Fahrenhorst, Hameln, Germany
 2002 Young Figuratives, inter alia with Hans-Jörg Holubitschka, Peter Lindenberg, Oliver Lochau, Bernard Lokai, Stefan Müller (alias Stefan Schwarzmüller), Katrin Roeber, Mönchehaus – Museum of Modern Art, Goslar, Germany
 2002 Gallery Frank, Munich, Germany
 2002 Dispute of the painters, with Hans-Jörg Holubitschka, Bernard Lokai, Peter Lindenberg, Stefan Müller, Katrin Roeber, Martin Leyer – Pritzkow exhibitions, Düsseldorf, Germany
 2003 "Villa Romana 2003", Museum Morsbroich, Leverkusen, Germany
 2003 Armin Baumgarten, Neil Tait, Jim Delarg, Fighting Gallery, Basel, Switzerland
 2003 Partition Project, Kaiser Hall, Burgbrohl, Germany
 2004 New Works, Gallery Winter, Wiesbaden, Germany
 2004 people pictures, gallery Kabuth, Gelsenkirchen, Germany
 2004 Head, Winter Gallery, Wiesbaden, Germany
 2004 Head -to-head, Gallery Netuschil, Darmstadt, Germany
 2005 40 x 40, Gallery Kabuth, Gelsenkirchen, Germany
 2005 Art Frankfurt, Winter Gallery, Frankfurt, Germany
 2006 Ball Artist Artist Ball, Kunstverein Gelsenkirchen, Germany
 2007 paintings and sculptures in the George Muller Foundation, Winter Gallery, Eltville, Germany
 2007 40 x 30, Orangery Palace Benrath, Düsseldorf, Germany
 2007 Together Art, Kunsthaus Wiesbaden, Gallery Winter, Wiesbaden, Germany
 2008 Nature and Engineering, Royal Gallery, Stuttgart, Germany
 2008 Painting and Sculpture, Martin Leyer – Pritzkow exhibitions, Düsseldorf, Germany
 2008 Contemporary Art Ruhr, gallery Kabuth, Gelsenkirchen, Germany 
 2009 Paper, Winter Gallery, Wiesbaden, Germany
 2009 Painting and Sculpture, mbf – art projects, Munich, Germany
 2010 Painting and Sculpture, Sparkasse gallery, Schweinfurt, Germany
 2010 Blue, Winter Gallery, Wiesbaden, Germany
 2010 Armin Baumgarten + Matthias Ruppel, Galerie Lehnert, Mainz, Germany
 2011 Art Karlsruhe, Winter Gallery, Karlsruhe, Germany
 2011 Mapping the world, The Art Space, Düsseldorf, Germany
 2012 Pictures Sculptures, Winter Gallery, Wiesbaden, Germany
 2012 Election relationship Dresden Gallery Sybille Nütt, Dresden, Germany
 2012 Pictures Sculptures, mbf – art projects, Munich, Germany
 2013 painting, sculpture, architectural models, volley art gallery, Leipzig, Germany
 2013 "Painters and Sculptors", Gallery Winter, Wiesbaden, Germany
 2014 "poiesis" Theartspace, Düsseldorf, Germany
 2014 "Painting and Sculpture", inter alia, with Werner Reuber, Gallery 23, Langenberg, German
 2014 "4 auf 8" with Hans-Jörg Holubitschka, Bernard Lokai and Katrin Roeber, Martin Leyer-Pritzkow Ausstellungen, Düsseldorf
 2015 "Wirklichkeit der Abstraktion" (Reality of the Abstraction), Martin Leyer-Pritzkow Ausstellungen, Düsseldorf
 2016 "Painting and Sculpture", Stiftung Burg Kniphausen, Wilhelmshaven
 2016 "Painting and Sculpture", Sparkassengalerie, Schweinfurt

References 
 
 Armin Baumgarten. Heads and mountains / Heads and Mountains, written by Dr. Christoph Hammer, Monograph, Wiesbaden, Germany and Basel, 2004, 
 Armin Baumgarten. Painting / sculpture / architecture models, written by Dr. Friedrich W. Heckmanns, exhibition catalog volley – art-gallery Leipzig, 2013
 Armin Baumgarten. Paintings and Sculptures ", written by Dr. Axel Wendelberger and Armin Baumgarten, Exhibition Gallery Winter / Wiesbaden, gallery nütt / Dresden, mbf-kunstprojekte/München, 2012, 
 Armin Baumgarten. Heads. Mountains. Figures, written by Armin Baumgarten, exhibition catalog MMI Academy Riddagshausen, Brunswick, 2006
 (Ed.) Martin Leyer-Pritzkow: Junge Figurative (young Figuratives) : Robert Ketterer [prolog], with contribution of Martin Leyer-Pritzkow, Christoph Zuschlag, Düsseldorf, 50 with artists: Woytek Berowski; Hans-Jörg Holubitschka; Peter Lindenberg; Oliver Lochau; Bernard Lokai; Stefan Müller; Benjamin Nachtwey; Katrin Roeber, in English and German language, 2001,  
 Armin Baumgarten, written by Armin Baumgarten, exhibition catalog Künstlerhaus Meinersen, 1997
 Convention: Manifesto of the group of painters convention, exhibition catalog Kunsthalle Braunschweig, 1996
 Karl Schwesig Prize, written by Leane Schäfer, Jörg Loskill, Hermann Albert, exhibition catalog Municipal Museum Gelsenkirchen, 1996
 Convention, exhibition catalog MMI Academy Riddagshausen, 1996
 Convention, text : 2.Manifest group of painters convention, exhibition catalog Gästehaus Petersberg, King Winter, 1997
 Künstlerhaus Meinersen, exhibition catalog of the Kunstverein Gifhorn, 1997
 Young artists from Wolfsburg, text by Wolfgang Guthardt, exhibition catalog Wolfsburg City Hall, 1998
 Figurative art boy, written by Christoph Hammer, exhibition catalog Ketterer in Caroline Palais, Munich, 2001
 The small format, exhibition catalog of the Gallery Winter, Wiesbaden, 2012
 Ball Artist Artist Ball, text by Matthias Peck and Leane Shepherd, Kunstverein Gelsenkirchen, 2006
 Painters and sculptors, exhibition catalog of the Gallery Winter, Wiesbaden, 2013

External links 
 Official website
 Literature from and about Armin Baumgarten in the German National Library
 Art works from Armin Baumgarten at Martin Leyer-Pritzkow

20th-century German painters
German male painters
21st-century German painters
21st-century German male artists
1967 births
Artists from Düsseldorf
Living people
20th-century German sculptors
20th-century German male artists
German male sculptors